Karkar may refer to:

Karkar, Selseleh, a village in Iran
Karkar Island, an island in Papua New Guinea
Karkar language, a language spoken in Papua New Guinea
Karkar Rural LLG, a local-level government in Papua New Guinea
Karkar Morghi Deli Bajak, a village in Iran
Qarqarçay, a river in the Republic of Azerbaijan
Muğanlı, Aghjabadi, a village in Azerbaijan also known as Karkar-Muganlysy
Qarqar, a town in Syria
Ras Karkar, a village in the West Bank
Boubacar Traoré, a Malian musician

See also
Qarqar (disambiguation)